Esfandan or Isfandan may refer to:
 Esfandan, Isfahan
 Esfandan, Kerman
 Esfandan, Kohgiluyeh and Boyer-Ahmad
 Esfandan, Markazi
 Esfandan, Mazandaran
 Esfandan Rural District, in Markazi Province